Thalpomys is a genus of South American rodents in the tribe Akodontini of family Cricetidae. Two species are known, both found in the cerrado tropical savanna ecoregion of central Brazil. They are as follows:
 Cerrado mouse (Thalpomys cerradensis)
 Hairy-eared cerrado mouse (Thalpomys lasiotis)

References 

 
Rodent genera
Fauna of the Cerrado
Taxa named by Oldfield Thomas